"Mother's Daughter" is a song by American singer Miley Cyrus. It first appeared as a digital track on Cyrus' second EP She Is Coming on May 31, 2019, then it was released to radio in early June by RCA Records, as the lead single from the record. It was written by Cyrus, Alma Miettinen, and its producer Andrew Wyatt. The Wuki remix debuted in August, and received a nomination for Best Remixed Recording at the 62nd Annual Grammy Awards. Its music video won two MTV Video Music Awards in 2020.

Composition
"Mother's Daughter" is 3 minutes and 39 seconds long. It was written by Cyrus, Alma Miettinen and its producer Andrew Wyatt. Lyrically, the song was described as a women's empowerment anthem. It focuses on the mother-daughter duo's strong relationship, and references how the singer's mother, Tish Cyrus, told her she'd "make it", singing: "I put my back into it, my heart in it/So I did it, yeah I did it.". Additionally, Cyrus describes herself as "nasty and evil", and explains that she has the freedom to do as she wishes: "Don't fuck with my freedom/I came up to get me some/I'm nasty, I'm evil/Must be something in the water or that I'm my mother's daughter", she sings in the chorus.

Commercial performance
Following the release of She Is Coming, "Mother's Daughter" debuted at number 54 on the US Billboard Hot 100. It is Cyrus' 47th entry on the chart, and her highest debut since "Adore You" entered at number 42 following the release of Bangerz in 2013.

Music video
The official music video was released on July 2, 2019. Alexandre Moors—who has helmed videos for Kendrick Lamar, Jennifer Lopez, ScHoolboy Q and Miguel, as well as the Jennifer Aniston-Alden Ehrenreich war drama The Yellow Birds—directed it. He and Cyrus finalized the concept as the anti-abortion “heartbeat bill” gained traction across the country.

It features Cyrus wearing a red latex catsuit against red lighting and aesthetics, and features shots of diverse women and nonbinary people, including plus-size women, women of color, disabled women, transgender women, and a nonbinary person using they/them pronouns, sitting and posing in different places. Cyrus' real-life mother Tish Cyrus makes a cameo appearance in the video. The video also shows nude scenes and has feminist signs flashing on-screen at random intervals. It is also sprinkled with images of breastfeeding, C-sections, menstrual pads—everything about the female body that's supposed to carry some taboo. The video is presented in 4:3 aspect ratio format.

Cyrus' red latex catsuit, calls back to the memorable outfits worn in Britney Spears' "Oops!...I Did It Again" and Lady Gaga's "Bad Romance" videos. Her version, however, has a bejeweled vagina dentata, as a notable embellishment. She also appears wearing a gold armor while atop a horse, holding a sword à la Joan of Arc. That latex look, otherwise, was not meant to be an explicit callback to the aforementioned musicians, but rather, "it was interesting to subvert some of the codes of the sexual attire, and actually transform beyond it into more of an armor or a fight suit" Moors said, "They look more like warriors than anything with sexual implications."

In coordination with the video drop, Cyrus shared 18 posts on her Instagram account that featured statements from those who make cameos.

The Insider placed the music video second on their list of the best music videos of 2019, commenting that "aside from the genius styling and gorgeous direction, the real triumph of Cyrus' video is how it highlights a wide variety of people who might connect with the song's message of empowerment and freedom".

Live performances
Cyrus first performed "Mother's Daughter", along with "Cattitude" and "D.R.E.A.M.", at BBC Radio 1's Big Weekend in Middlesbrough on May 25, 2019. It was also performed at Primavera Sound in Barcelona on May 31, Orange Warsaw Festival in Warsaw on June 1, Tinderbox in Odense on June 28, and at Glastonbury Festival in Pilton on June 30. Later Cyrus performed song on iHeartRadio Music Festival 2019 in Las Vegas.

Legacy 
On October 22, 2020, the Constitutional Tribunal of Poland ruled that an abortion in cases of "disability or incurable illness" of fetus is unconstitutional (in practice, the provision that was ruled unconstitutional represented the majority of more than 90% abortions legally done in Poland each year). Due to this, "Mother's Daughter" went viral in Poland, becoming one of the most listened to songs at the time. Thousands of women took the streets to demand decriminalization of abortion with phrases inspired by the verses of the song such as "Don't mess with my freedom" written on posters. The phenomenon had several pictures circulating the internet, as well as videos of the protesters singing the song, and was also shared and endorsed by Cyrus on her social media.

Track listing
 R3hab Remix – Single
 "Mother's Daughter" (R3hab Remix) – 2:32

 Wuki Remix – Single
 "Mother's Daughter" (Wuki Remix) – 3:08

 White Panda Remix – Single
 "Mother's Daughter" (White Panda Remix) – 2:55

Credits and personnel
Credits adapted from Tidal.
 Miley Cyrus – vocals, songwriter
 Alma – songwriter
 Andrew Wyatt – producer, songwriter
 Jacob Munk – recording engineer
 John Hanes – recording engineer
 Tay Keith – programmer
 Şerban Ghenea – mixing engineer

Awards and nominations

Charts

Weekly charts

Year-end charts

Certifications

Release history

References

2019 singles
2019 songs
Miley Cyrus songs
RCA Records singles
Songs with feminist themes
Songs written by Andrew Wyatt
Songs written by Miley Cyrus
Cultural depictions of Britney Spears
Song recordings produced by Andrew Wyatt
Songs written by Alma (Finnish singer)
Songs about mothers
Protest songs
Transgender-related mass media